Max Skladanowsky (30 April 1863 – 30 November 1939) was a German inventor and early filmmaker. Along with his brother Emil, he invented the Bioscop, an early movie projector the Skladanowsky brothers used to display a moving picture show to a paying audience on 1 November 1895, shortly before the public debut of the Lumière Brothers' Cinématographe in Paris on 28 December 1895.

Career

Born as the fourth child of glazier Carl Theodor Skladanowsky (1830–1897) and Luise Auguste Ernestine Skladanowsky, Max Skladanowsky was apprenticed as a photographer and glass painter, which led to an interest in magic lanterns. In 1879, he began to tour Germany and Central Europe with his father Carl and elder brother Emil, giving dissolving magic lantern shows. While Emil mostly took care of promotion, Max was mostly involved with the technology and for instance developed special multi-lens devices that allowed simultaneous projection of up to nine separate image sequences. Carl retired from this show business, but Max and Emil continued and added other attractions, including a type of naumachia that involved electro-mechanical effects and pyrotechnics. 

Max would later claim to have constructed their first film camera on 20 August 1892, but this more likely happened in the summer or autumn of 1894. He also single-handedly constructed the Bioskop projector. Partially based on the dissolving view lantern, it featured two lenses and two separate film reels, one frame being projected alternately from each. It was hand-cranked to transport 44.5mm-wide unperforated Eastman-Kodak film-stock, which was carefully cut, perforated and re-assembled by hand and coated with an emulsion developed by Max. The projector was placed behind a screen, which was made properly transparent by keeping it wet to show the images optimally.

The Skladanowsky brothers shot several films in May 1895. Their first film recorded Emil performing overstated movements on a rooftop with a panorama of Berlin in the background. This was an experimental test, not to be used in their commercial screenings. Their further choice of subjects seemed influenced by the films they probably viewed in the Kinetoscope that was installed in Berlin in March. They filmed various variety acts who were performing in town and had them perform in the gardens of theatres in full sunlight, against a neutral background (usually white, sometimes black).

Test screenings were held at the Gasthaus Sello in July 1895, attended by some invited friends and colleagues. The directors of the Wintergarten music hall were impressed enough after seeing a screening of the Bioskop to eventually sign the Skladanowsky brothers in September for the substantial fee of 2500 Goldmark. The Skladanowsky brothers would first stage a naumachia show at the Wintergarten, re-enacting an Alexandrian sea battle, in October. From 1 November 1895 until the end of the month they would provide a motion picture show, which was eventually screened 23 times. Their circa 15-minutes picture show was part of an evening program that lasted over three hours, which further included all kinds of variety acts, such as Mr. Thompson and his three trained elephants. In an advertisement for the program, the Bioskop appeared right at the center in an extra bold typeface with the statement "New! The most interesting invention of the modern age". The Skladanowskys showed eight films, varying in length from 99 to 174 frames (circa 6 to 11 seconds if played at 16 fps), looped repeatedly, while a specially composed score was played especially loud to drown out the noise of the machinery. The "Apotheose" film showed the brothers entering the frame from opposite sites in front of a white background, bowing towards the camera as if receiving applause and walking out of the frame again. When their show was finished they replicated the action in person in front of the projection screen. The popular venue was filled to capacity with circa 1500 rich patrons for each evening program, but not all of them watched the films. Reviews favoured the three elephants, but the Bioskop was reportedly well-received with extensive applause and flowers thrown at the screen. However, the Berlin papers were seldom critical about shows due to the revenue of the theatre advertisements they placed.

After finishing the Wintergarten run of shows, the Bioskop opened in the Hamburg Concerthaus on 21 December 1895 as a single program, without any other acts. On the 27th they traveled to Paris, engaged to play the Folies Bergère from 1 January 1896. Coincidentally, the Lumière brothers happened to present their Cinematograph in their first commercial public screening on the 28th in Paris. One of the Bergère proprietors took them to the second presentation, on the 29th, and then cancelled the booking of the Bioskop, nonetheless paying them in full. This possibly had something to do with patent rights, but the Cinematograph was clearly superior in image quality and much more easily operated than the Bioskop, and the Skladanowsky brothers may as well have preferred not to compete. A planned appearance at the London Empire Theatre was also cancelled, but they were able to further tour Kothen, Halle and Magdeburg in central Germany in March 1896; Kristiana (now Oslo), Norway from 6 April to 5 May; Groningen from 14 to 24 May and Amsterdam from 21 May, the Netherlands; Copenhagen, Denmark from 11 June to 30 July; and Stockholm, Sweden from 3 August until September 1896.

Max had constructed a new camera with a Geneva drive in the autumn of 1895, and the new single-lens Bioskop-II projector in the summer of 1896.
They also recorded new films (on 63mm-wide celluloid), much needed since the old ones started to get damaged, including the fiction film Komische Begegnung im Tiergarten zu Stockholm (Comical Encounter in Djurgården, Stockholm) in August 1896 with professional actors from the Victoria Theatre company. It was the first film recorded in Sweden. They returned to Berlin in February 1897, and shot several crowded urban street scenes. The new films were thought to meet the taste of new audiences and were much needed since the older films started to wear out. However, the investments proved to be in vain as a proposed return to the Wintergarten was not approved, their trade license was not renewed as the authorities believed there were already too many film exhibitors active in town, and they managed to find one venue for a second tour. Eventually, the last Bioskop show by the Skladanosky brothers took place in Stettin on 30 March 1897.

After this Skladanowsky returned to his former photographic activities including the production of flip books and further magic lantern shows. He also sold amateur film cameras and projectors and produced 3-D anaglyph image slides. His company Projektion für Alle also produced a number of films in the early 20th century, some directed by Eugen, his younger brother, but with little success. In his later years Skladanowsky was accused in the press of exaggerating his role in the early days of cinema, most notably by the pioneering cameraman Guido Seeber.

Legacy
Between the years 1895 and 1905, the brothers directed at least 25 to 30 short movies. In 1995, the German filmmaker Wim Wenders directed a drama documentary film Die Gebrüder Skladanowsky in collaboration with students of the Munich Academy for Television and Film in which Max Skladanowsky was played by Udo Kier.

In the Netherlands and the Balkans the word "bioscop" means cinema.

Filmography

 1895 : Bauerntanz zweier Kinder
 1895 : Komisches Reck
 1895 : Die Serpentintänzerin
 1895 : Jongleur
 1895 : Das Boxende Känguruh
 1895 : Akrobatisches Potpourri
 1895 : Kamarinskaja
 1895 : Ringkämpfer
 1895 : Apotheose
 1896 : Unter den Linden
 1896 : Nicht mehr allein
 1896 : Mit Ablösung der Wache
 1896 : Lustige Gesellschaft vor dem Tivoli in Kopenhagen
 1896 : Leben und Treiben am Alexanderplatz
 1896 : Komische Begenung im Tiergarten zu Stockholm
 1896 : Ausfahrt nach dem Alarm
 1896 : Ankunft eines Eisenbahnzuges
 1896 : Alarm der Feuerwehr
 1896 : Die Wachtparade
 1897 : Am Bollwerk in Stettin
 1897 : Apotheose II
 1897 : Am Bollwerk
 1900 : Eine Moderne Jungfrau von Orleans
 1905 : Eine Fliegenjagd oder Die Rache der Frau Schultze

See also
List of film formats

References

Castan, Joachim. Max Skladanowsky oder der Beginn einer deutschen Filmgeschichte, Stuttgart, 1995. . Standard work about Skladanowsky - exciting and profound. It's a pity that there's no English translation.

External links

 
 
 
 

1863 births
1939 deaths
Cinema pioneers
19th-century German inventors
Businesspeople from Berlin
People from the Province of Brandenburg
Film directors from Berlin
People from Pankow